Simunic may refer to:

 Šimunić, a Croatian surname
 Simunić, a Croatian surname